Thiébauménil is a commune in the Meurthe-et-Moselle department in Grand Est, France.

Geography 
Thiébauménil is located on the Vezouze at 3,500m. To the west stretches a vast plateau with siliceous soil, to the east rises a hillside with clay soil towards Manonviller where a fort was established.

The town is 10 km from Lunéville.

Town Planning

Typology 
Thiébauménil is a rural municipality, because it is one of the low or very low density municipalities, within the meaning of the INSEE municipal density grid.

In addition, the commune is part of the Nancy attraction area, of which it is a commune of the crown. This area, which includes 353 municipalities, is categorized in areas with 200,000 to less than 700,000 inhabitants.

Land use 
The land cover of the municipality, as it appears from the European biophysical land cover database Corine Land Cover (CLC), is marked by the importance of agricultural land (66.9% in 2018) , a proportion roughly equivalent to that of 1990 (66.4%). The detailed distribution in 2018 is as follows: arable land (37.5%), forests (23.9%), grasslands (19.4%), heterogeneous agricultural areas (10%), urbanized areas (9%), areas industrial or commercial and communication networks (0.2%).

The IGN also provides an online tool to compare the evolution over time of land use in the municipality (or territories at different scales). Several periods are accessible in the form of maps or aerial photos: the Cassini map (18th century), the staff map (1820-1866) and the current period (1950 to today).

Toponymy 
From a personal name Theotbald (Thibaut) + mansionile.

Tibamesni (1152), Theobalmasnil (1156), Thiebautmanil (1268).

History 
The villages of Thiébauménil and Marainviller have intimately intertwined histories. Their territories have been part of the many possessions of the Abbey of Belchamp since the 12th century.

Devastated during the Thirty Years War, Thiébauménil suffered a fire on September 26, 1632 which destroyed 42 homes. After the wars, in 1712, the parish had only 25 households. There were 135 in 1888. Thiébauménil was again annexed on July 3, 1811 to Marainviller.

On August 13, 1911, a station on the line from Lunéville to Blâmont and Badonviller (the LBB) was inaugurated in Thiébauménil by Minister Albert Lebrun. The line's traffic operated until 1942. The station, located south of the town, became a dwelling in the 21st century.

Demographics 
The evolution of the number of inhabitants is known through the population censuses carried out in the municipality since 1793. From 2006, the legal populations of the municipalities are published annually by INSEE. The census is now based on an annual collection of information, successively concerning all the municipal territories over a period of five years. For municipalities with less than 10,000 inhabitants, a census survey covering the entire population is carried out every five years, the legal populations of the intermediate years being estimated by interpolation or extrapolation. For the municipality, the first exhaustive census falling within the framework of the new system was carried out in 2006.

In 2020, the town had 382 inhabitants, down 1.55% compared to 2014 (Meurthe-et-Moselle: +0.06%, France excluding Mayotte: +1.9%).

Economy 
Basketry was a traditional activity of the town.

As of August 24, 2021, Thiébauménil has 27 establishments: 13 in the operation of real estate, 7 in animal production, 3 in non-store trade, 2 in administration and 2 for human health.

See also
Communes of the Meurthe-et-Moselle department

References

Communes of Meurthe-et-Moselle